Chevy Chase Village, Maryland is an incorporated municipality in Montgomery County, Maryland, United States, bordering Washington, D.C. It is made up of sections 1, 1a, and 2 of Chevy Chase, as originally designated by The Chevy Chase Land Company. The population was 1,953 as of the 2010 census. The town is the wealthiest in Maryland, with a median income of over $250,000, the highest income bracket listed by the census bureau, and a median home value of $1,823,800.

Chevy Chase Village includes 721 homes. It is known for its speed limit enforcement actions, which produce 24% of its annual revenue. 

The suburb was created to be all-white; it remains overwhelmingly so more than a century later. 

Chevy Chase Village is the location of the Chevy Chase Club, a private country club with an initiation fee of over $50,000.

Geography

History

Chevy Chase Village was created in 1890 as a streetcar suburb. In 1914, it became a special taxing area. It was incorporated in 1951.

Government

The village is managed by a board of managers, which consists of 7 elected officials.

The village has its own police department.

About 46% of the village's revenue is from income taxes, 20% is from property taxes, and 24% is from citations from speed limit enforcement along Connecticut Avenue, a commuter route than runs through the village.

Demographics

2010 census
As of the census of 2010, there were 1,953 people, 697 households, and 609 families living in the town. The racial makeup of the town was 95.9% White, 0.6% African American, 0.2% Native American, 1.6% Asian, 0.5% from other races, and 1.3% from two or more races. Hispanic or Latino of any race were 2.8% of the population.

There were 697 households, of which 36.9% had children under the age of 18 living with them, 82.2% were married couples living together, 3.9% had a female householder with no husband present, 1.3% had a male householder with no wife present, and 12.6% were non-families. 11.2% of all households were made up of individuals, and 7% had someone living alone who was 65 years of age or older. The average household size was 2.80 and the average family size was 2.99.

The median age in the town was 49.1 years. 26.4% of residents were under the age of 18; 3.6% were between the ages of 18 and 24; 13.5% were from 25 to 44; 36.3% were from 45 to 64; and 20% were 65 years of age or older. The gender makeup of the town was 48.5% male and 51.5% female.

2000 census
As of the census of 2000, there were 2,043 people, 704 households, and 601 families living in the town. The racial makeup of the town was 95.64% White, 0.69% African American, 1.62% Asian, 0.59% from other races, and 1.47% from two or more races. Hispanic or Latino of any race were 1.71% of the population.

There were 704 households, out of which 43.3% had children under the age of 18 living with them, 79.5% were married couples living together, 4.7% had a female householder with no husband present, and 14.5% were non-families. 12.5% of all households were made up of individuals, and 8.9% had someone living alone who was 65 years of age or older. The average household size was 2.90 and the average family size was 3.11 people per household.

In the town, the population was spread out, with 29.0% under the age of 18, 4.0% from 18 to 24, 14.5% from 25 to 44, 38.2% from 45 to 64, and 14.2% who were 65 years of age or older. The median age was 46 years. For every 100 females, there were 98.7 males. For every 100 females age 18 and over, there were 90.2 males.

The median income for a household in the town was in excess of $200,000, as is the median income for a family. Males had a median income of over $100,000 versus $76,067 for females. The per capita income for the town was $95,174. About 1.3% of families and 2.0% of the population were below the poverty line, including 2.8% of those under age 18 and none of those age 65 or over.

Transportation

Two state highways run through Chevy Chase Village: Maryland Route 185 (Connecticut Avenue), which extends north past Interstate 495 (the Capital Beltway) and south to Washington, D.C.; and Maryland Route 186 (Brookville Road), a minor local connector that parallels MD 185 to the east.

Education
Chevy Chase Village is served by the Montgomery County Public Schools system.

Residents are zoned to Rosemary Hills Elementary School (PreK-2) (Unincorporated Montgomery County) and Chevy Chase Elementary School (3-6) (in the town of Chevy Chase). Some residents are zoned to Somerset Elementary School (K-5) (in Somerset, Maryland.

All residents are zoned to Westland Middle School and Bethesda-Chevy Chase High School, located in unincorporated Montgomery County.

Notable people

Current residents
 Ann Brashares - author
 Marvin Kalb - journalist
 Chris Matthews - commentator
 Jerome Powell - Chairman of the Federal Reserve Board of Governors
 John Roberts - Chief Justice of the United States
 Mark Shields - political columnist
 George Will - commentator

Former residents
 David Brinkley - journalist
 Sandra Day O'Connor - United States Supreme Court Justice; lived in Chevy Chase Village until 2005

References

External links

 
 

1910 establishments in Maryland
Chevy Chase, Maryland
Populated places established in 1910
Suburbs of Washington, D.C.
Towns in Maryland
Towns in Montgomery County, Maryland
Upper class culture in Maryland